The Central District of Falvarjan County is a district (bakhsh) in Falavarjan County, Isfahan Province, Iran. At the 2006 census, its population was 181,602, in 46,926 families.  The District has six cities: Falavarjan, Kelishad va Sudarjan, Qahderijan, Abrisham, Zazeran, and Imanshahr. The District has four rural districts (dehestan): Abrisham Rural District, Golestan Rural District, Oshtorjan Rural District, and Zazeran Rural District.

References 

Falavarjan County
Districts of Isfahan Province